The Association of Guernsey Charities is the umbrella organisation that represents the voluntary and charitable sector in the Bailiwick of Guernsey.

Association history
The Association was formed in 1984 with the aim of providing opportunities for those working with charities to meet together to discuss topics of mutual interest, raise any concerns or issues, and learn about matters which may affect or help the sector. The Association's website includes details about the sector, information for organisations, and a separate page on each local charity.

The Association runs a website for charities to advertise when they need new volunteers – either for a key role, or one-off event.

The Association is a Guernsey Registered Charity - number CH86.

In 2016 the Association launched a giving website for local charities to collect donations. The service does not charge any admin or setup fees. Users can also create a fundraising page to collect donations in favour of a local charity.

Christmas Lottery 
The States of Guernsey and Jersey jointly operate the Channel Islands Lottery. Responsibility in Guernsey is under the mandate of the States Trading Supervisory Board. Each year, the proceeds from the sale of tickets for the Christmas Lottery are given to charity. The proceeds from tickets sold in Guernsey are given to the Association of Guernsey Charities to distribute. The Association is responsible for the grant application and distribution process.  The Association of Guernsey Charities also works with the States of Guernsey to improve the outcomes to increase the amount of money available for charities.

Giving.gg 
The Association of Guernsey Charities launched a Guernsey-based charity donation platform in 2016.  This allows organisations to collect donations online, without any additional fees or charges being deducted.

Volunteers' Week
Volunteers' Week is an annual campaign which, in the UK, runs 1 to 7 June. The purpose is to highlight the amount of work undertaken by volunteers and to encourage more people to try some volunteering activity. Volunteers' Week is coordinated by the National Council for Voluntary Organisations. The Association of Guernsey Charities coordinates Guernsey publicity of Volunteers' Week, focussing attention on the need for volunteers to help local charities and benefit the community.

References

1984 establishments in Europe
Organisations based in Guernsey
Charities based in Europe